Greenane may refer to: 

 One of the Galty Mountains in Munster, Ireland
 Alternative spelling of Greenan, County Wicklow, Ireland, a village